Benjamin Lüthi (born 30 November 1988) is a retired Swiss professional footballer who played as a right-back or as a midfielder.

Career
In December 2016, Lüthi announced his immediate retirement from professional football.

References

External links
 Profile at Soccerway

Living people
1988 births
Association football fullbacks
Association football midfielders
Swiss men's footballers
FC Thun players
Grasshopper Club Zürich players
Swiss Super League players